Hotel Splendide is a 2000 British independent dark comedy film, written and directed by Terence Gross and starring Toni Collette and Daniel Craig. The film appeared in a number of British and European film festivals but was not released in the US, although it did appear on cable networks on channels catering to independent film. It is currently available in the UK on DVD and the U.S. on video on demand.

The film tells the story of the Blanche family who run a dark and dismal health resort on a remote island which is only accessible by ferry. The spa program consists of feeding the guests seaweed and eel-based meals, then administering liberal colonic irrigation. The spa is run by the family matriarch, Dame Blanche, until her death.

Things continue with her children running the resort until Kath, the resort's former sous chef and the love interest of one of the sons, comes back to the island unannounced. Stranded between monthly ferries, she is a catalyst for a series of events that turns life as it is known at Hotel Splendide on its ear.

Cast
Toni Collette as Kath
Daniel Craig as Ronald Blanche
Katrin Cartlidge as Cora Blanche
Stephen Tompkinson as Dezmond Blanche
Hugh O'Conor as Stanley Smith
Helen McCrory as Lorna Bull
Peter Vaughan as Morton Blanche
Joerg Stadler as Sergei Gorgonov
Clare Cathcart as Lorraine Bull
John Boswall as Bellboy
Toby Jones as Kitchen Boy
Dan Hildebrand as Waiter
Imogen Claire as Edna Blanche

Production
The film was shot partially on location at the Slieve Donard hotel in Newcastle, Northern Ireland.

References

External links
 
 

2000 films
2000 black comedy films
2000s English-language films
British black comedy films
Films set in hotels
Films shot in Northern Ireland
Films shot in England
2000 comedy films
2000s British films